is a Japanese professional wrestler. She is currently signed to World Wonder Ring Stardom under the ring name .

Professional wrestling career

World Wonder Ring Stardom (2022-present)
She revealed Dragon Gate as being her first ever wrestling encounter, promotion which she used to watch since elementary school.

Matsuda made her professional wrestling debut on March 11, 2022 at the World Wonder Ring Stardom's New Blood 1 event, dedicated to rookies, where she was defeated by Utami Hayashishita. Despite her loss, Hayashishita was impressed by the latter's performance, therefore inviting the debutant to join the Queen's Quest unit which Matsuda immediately accepted. On the first night of the Stardom World Climax 2022 from March 26, she teamed up with her new unit stablemates, Lady C and AZM, to compete in a six-woman tag team gauntlet match, won by Donna Del Mondo (Himeka, Natsupoi, and Mai Sakurai) and also involving Cosmic Angels (Waka Tsukiyama, Mina Shirakawa and Momo Kohgo), and Oedo Tai (Saki Kashima, Fukigen Death and Ruaka). On the second night of the event from March 27, she competed in an 18-woman Cinderella Rumble match, in which she was eliminated by Mei Suruga. At the Stardom Cinderella Tournament 2022 event, she was defeated by Hazuki in the first-round matches from April 3. At Stardom Flashing Champions on May 28, 2022, Amasaki teamed up with Utami Hayashishita in a losing effort against White Nights (Tam Nakano and Kairi). At Stardom Fight in the Top on June 26, 2022, she teamed up with Lady C in a losing effort against Stars (Momo Kohgo and Saya Iida). At Stardom New Blood 3 on July 8, 2022, Amasaki main evented the pay-per-view by falling short to Giulia. At Mid Summer Champions in Tokyo, the first event of the Stardom Mid Summer Champions which took place on July 24, 2022, Amasaki teamed up with Utami Hayashishita in a losing effort against God's Eye (Mirai and Ami Sourei). At Mid Summer Champions in Nagoya on July 24, 2022, she teamed up with Lady C and Hina and fought in a three-way tag team match won by Prominence (Risa Sera, Hiragi Kurumi and Suzu Suzuki) and also involving Cosmic Angels (Mina Shirakawa, Unagi Sayaka and Hikari Shimizu). At Stardom in Showcase vol.1, Amasaki was the runner up of a Nagoya rumble match won by Gokigen Death. Matsuda competed in one of the two qualifying blocks for the Stardom 5 Star Grand Prix 2022, where she finished on the second spot with a total of four points, missing the qualification to Ami Sourei. At Stardom x Stardom: Nagoya Midsummer Encounter on August 21, 2022, Matsuda unsuccessfully challenged Hanan for the Future of Stardom Championship. Five days later at Stardom New Blood 4, she main evented the show by falling short to Tam Nakano. At Stardom Gold Rush on November 19, 2022, she teamed up with Lady C and unsuccessfully competed in a three-way tag team match. Matsuda made her first appearance in the Goddesses of Stardom Tag League at the 2022 edition where she teamed up with her Queen's Quest sub-group of "02line" tag partner AZM and competed in the "Blue Goddess Block", fighting against the teams of BMI2000 (Natsuko Tora and Ruaka), MaiHime (Maika and Himeka), 7Upp (Nanae Takahashi and Yuu), The New Eras (Mirai and Ami Sourei), FWC (Hazuki and Koguma), Kawild Venus (Mina Shirakawa and Saki), and wing★gori (Hanan and Saya Iida).

New Japan Pro Wrestling (2022-present)
Due to being a Stardom roster member, Matsuda often competed in cross-over shows co-promoted by New Japan Pro Wrestling. She made her first appearance at Historic X-Over on November 20, 2022, where she competed in a Stardom rambo won by Mirai.

References

2002 births
Living people
21st-century professional wrestlers
Japanese female professional wrestlers
People from Kyoto Prefecture
Sportspeople from Kyoto Prefecture